The Republic of Crimea was the interim name of a polity on the Crimean peninsula between the dissolution of the Crimean Autonomous Soviet Socialist Republic in 1992 and the abolition of the Crimean Constitution by the Ukrainian Parliament in 1995. This period was one of conflict with the Ukrainian government over the levels of autonomy that Crimea enjoyed in relation to Ukraine and links between the ethnically Russian Crimea and the Russian Federation.

Background

Crimea is overwhelmingly ethnically Russian at around 70% of the population in 1994, unlike any other area of Ukraine. Traditionally it had been a part of Russia, although this had changed in 1954 with the transfer of Crimea to the Ukrainian Soviet Socialist Republic. With the breakup of the Soviet Union in 1991 there were fears that an independent Ukraine would aggressively follow a policy of Ukrainianization on the ethnically Russian peninsula. There were also conflicting claims between Russia and Ukraine for ownership of the Russian Black Sea fleet and the strategic Sevastopol Naval Base.

Crimean ASSR

From the establishment of Soviet control over Crimea in 1921 until the German occupation in September 1942, Crimea had a degree of autonomy as the Crimean Autonomous Socialist Soviet Republic of the Russian SFSR. To punish the Crimean Tartars for their alleged crimes during the war, in 1945 the Republic's status was reduced to a Crimean oblast in the Russian SFSR with less autonomy. The oblast was transferred to the Ukrainian Soviet Socialist Republic in 1954. In January 1991 the Crimean sovereignty referendum was held to increase Crimean autonomy within Ukraine by re-establishing the Crimean ASSR and approved by 94%. of voters on a turnout above 80%. In September 1991 the Crimean Parliament declared the territory to be a sovereign constituent part of Ukraine.

In August 1991, Yuriy Meshkov established the Republican Movement of Crimea which was registered on 19 November to revive the republican status of the region and its sovereignty. With the help of the Black Sea Fleet administration, in February 1992 the movement initiated gathering of signatures for a referendum for Crimea in the new Soviet Union.

Formation

On 26 February 1992, the Crimean parliament changed the official name from the Crimean ASSR  to the Republic of Crimea. Then on 5 May, it proclaimed self-government and twice enacted a constitution that the Ukrainian Parliament and goverernment deemed to be inconsistent with Ukraine's constitution. Finally in June 1992, the parties reached a compromise, Crimea would have considerable autonomy but remain part of Ukraine.

Relations with Ukraine

At first Crimean authorities attempted to claim that it was a sovereign Republic albeit with a relationship with Ukraine. On 5 May 1992, the Crimean legislature declared conditional independence, but a referendum to confirm the decision was never held amid opposition from Kyiv. 

On 17 December 1992, the office of the Ukrainian presidential representative in Crimea was created. In January 1993 the previous months' creation of the office of the Ukrainian presidential representative in Crimea caused a wave of protests. Among the protesters that created the unsanctioned rally were the Sevastopol branches of the National Salvation Front, the Russian Popular Assembly, and the All-Crimean Movement of the Voters for the Republic of Crimea.

In February 1994 the Ukrainian Parliament issued an ultimatum to Crimea, which had just elected the pro-Russian Meshkov, giving it a month to harmonise its laws with Ukraine.  However Meshkov did try to institute a number of symbolic measures, such as harmonising the time with Russia rather than Ukraine.

Relations with Russia

Russian politicians had from the time of Ukraine's independence questioned the 1954 transfer of Crimea, including prominent politicians such as mayor of Moscow Yury Luzhkov and Vladimir Zhirinovsky. In October 1991 Russian Vice President Alexander Rutskoi, on a visit to Kyiv, claimed Russian control and ownership of the Black Sea fleet, based in Sevastopol, and, indirectly, Russian sovereignty over the whole Crimean Peninsula. In April 1992 a similar resolution claiming Crimea was passed by the Russian Federation parliament.

The Crimean Parliament's choice of flag in September 1992 was seen as mimicking the Russian tricolor.

The status of Sevastopol, due to its strategic importance as the main base of the Russian Black Sea Fleet, remained disputed between Ukraine and Russia, with the rogue Russian Parliament staking a claim for Sevastopol in 1993. On 11 December 1992, the President of Ukraine called the attempt of "the Russian deputies to charge the Russian parliament with a task to define the status of Sevastopol as an 'imperial disease'". 

In April 1993, during the 1993 Russian constitutional crisis, the Russian Parliament proposed to support a referendum on Crimean independence and include the republic as a separate entity in the Commonwealth of Independent States, an offer that was later withdrawn. After Boris Yeltsin won his struggle with the Russian Parliament the Russian stance towards Ukraine changed.  Yeltsin refused to meet with the Crimean President, and Russian Prime Minister Viktor Chernomyrdin stated that Russia had no claim on Crimea.

In 1994, the legal status of Crimea as part of Ukraine was backed up by Russia, who pledged to uphold the territorial integrity of Ukraine in a memorandum signed in 1994, also signed by the US and UK.

Dissolution

On 30 January 1994, the pro-Russian Yuriy Meshkov was elected as President of Crimea on a pro Russian platform against the favoured candidate of the local establishment, Nikolai Bagrov. Despite then winning a referendum on further autonomy Meshkov quickly ran into conflicts with parliament. On 8 September, the Crimean parliament degraded the President's powers from the head of state to the head of the executive power only, to which Meshkov responded by disbanding parliament and announcing his control over Crimea four days later.

Ukraine decided to intervene. On 21 September 1994 the Ukrainian Parliament renamed the Republic of Crimea as the Autonomous Republic of Crimea, and a week later the new Ukrainian President named Anatoliy Franchuk as the Prime Minister of Crimea.  On 17 March 1995, the Ukrainian parliament abolished the Crimean Constitution of 1992, all the laws and decrees contradicting those enacted by Kyiv, removed Yuriy Meshkov as President of Crimea and abolished the office itself. After this Ukrainian National Guard troops entered Meshkov's residence, disarmed his bodyguards and put him on a plane to Moscow. 

On 31 March the Ukrainian President Leonid Kuchma issued a decree that subordinated the Crimean government to the Ukrainian Cabinet and that gave the Ukrainian President the power to appoint the Prime Minister of Crimea.  Crimea's status of being subordinate to Kyiv was confirmed eventually by the remaining Crimean authorities.

From June until September 1995, Kuchma governed Crimea under a direct presidential administration decree. Crimea (with the exception of the city of Sevastopol) was designated an Autonomous Republic in the Ukrainian Constitution of 1996. After an interim constitution, the 1998 Constitution of the Autonomous Republic of Crimea was ratified, changing the territory's name to the Autonomous Republic of Crimea.

See also

History of Crimea

Notes

References

Political history of Crimea
1992 establishments in Ukraine
1995 disestablishments in Ukraine
States and territories disestablished in 1995
States and territories established in 1992

Sources